Helinä Marjamaa (born 5 June 1956) is a Finnish sprinter. She competed in the 100 metres at the 1980 Summer Olympics and the 1984 Summer Olympics.

International competitions

References

External links
 

1956 births
Living people
Athletes (track and field) at the 1980 Summer Olympics
Athletes (track and field) at the 1984 Summer Olympics
Finnish female sprinters
Olympic athletes of Finland
Place of birth missing (living people)
Olympic female sprinters